Return from the Sea is a 1954 American drama film directed by Lesley Selander and starring Jan Sterling, Neville Brand and John Doucette. It was based on a novelette No Home of His Own by  Jacland Marmur that appeared in Saturday Evening Post in 1952. The film's sets were designed by the art director Dave Milton. It was distributed by Allied Artists Pictures.

Synopsis
Chuck MacLish (Neville Brand) is a hardened career naval Chief Petty Officer, who is a boisterous, love 'em and leave 'em type — until he meets a lonely, widowed waitress named Frieda (Jan Sterling).

Cast
 Jan Sterling as Frieda - Waitress
 Neville Brand as CPO Chuck 'Soup Bowl' MacLish
 John Doucette as Jimmy 
 Paul Langton as Lt. Manley
 John Pickard as Spike
 Don Haggerty as Tompkins
 Alvy Moore as Smitty
 Robert Arthur as Porter
 Lloyd Corrigan as Pinky
 Lee Roberts as Doctor
 Ward Wood as Clarke
 Robert Patten as Welch
 James Best as Barr
 John Tarangelo as Doyle
 Bill Gentry as Harris
 Herb Vigran as 	Doctor
 Pamela Duncan as Nurse
 Carol Brewster as New Waitress

References

External links 
 
 
 
 

1954 films
American black-and-white films
Korean War films
Films based on American novels
American war drama films
Allied Artists films
Films scored by Paul Dunlap
1950s war drama films
1950s English-language films
1950s American films